Konstvägen sju älvar is a tourist and sculpture route in Västerbotten in North Sweden that travels 350 kilometers in from the coast.

Description 
Seven Rivers Art goes from Umeå port in Holmsund at the Gulf of Bothnia in Västerbotten to Borgafjäll in Lapland through Umeå and Dorotea. The art route follows the E12, highway 92 and County Road 1052. Since 1997, thirteen artworks have been erected along this road. The art route is 350 kilometers long and crosses seven rivers namely the Vindelälven, Umeälven, Öreälven, Lögdeälven, Gideälven, Ångermanälven and Saxälven. The art project is managed by the non government organisation Konstvägen Seven Rivers with the support of the five effected municipalities.

Sculptures 

  Location North 63 degrees 40.8 minutes east 20 degrees 20.6 minutes  by Mats Caldeborg, galvanized steel, Umeå port 
 8 11 av Fredrik Wretman, 1998, Baggböle 
Hägring av Kent Karlsson, 1999, mitt emellan Vännäs och Bjurholm 
Eldsoffa by Ulf Rollof , brick, west of the intersection E12/Riksväg 92, at the eastern entrance to the Vännäsvägen  
Mirage by Kent Karlsson , 1999, between Vännäsvägen and Bjurholm  
Oh you lovely country by Mattias Baudin and Linda Baudin, 2011, Balsjö , 5 km west of Bjurholm
Vägabstraktion by Jacob Dahlgren, 2011, at Lögdeälven, 23 km west of Bjurholm
Poem imaginary river of Sigurdur Gudmundsson, bronze, in the reservoir Skinnmuddselet in Gideälven, 6 kilometers west of Fredrika  
A charged space by Michael Richter, on a bog 7 km west of Åsele and just west of the village Hammar  
Heaven Peace of Solfrid Mortensen, concrete, on a hill, 55 kilometers west of Dorotea and 5 kilometers west of the village of Highland  
Light Phenomenon by Olov Tällström, piles and headlights, slope at Little-Arksjön, 62 km west of Dorotea and 1.5 kilometers west of the village Storbäck 
Nybyggarkvinnan by Anne-Karin Furunes, 2003, former summer pasture area at the village Varpsjö, 32 km west of Åsele , marble, 2004, at the shop in the village Ormsjö , 30 kilometers west of Dorothea, is created in memory of the 14 log floaters who drowned at the so called Ormsjöolyckan in 1936.

References

Printed sources 
 The Journal Vasterbotten 99-1. The article "Moving History"

External links 
 Konstvägen seven rivers website
 slideshow

Public art in Umeå